Sainte-Foy-de-Montgommery is a former commune in the Calvados department in the Normandy region in northwestern France. On 1 January 2016, it was merged into the new commune of Val-de-Vie.

Population

See also
Communes of the Calvados department

References

External links

About Sainte-Foy-de-Montgommery

Former communes of Calvados (department)
Calvados communes articles needing translation from French Wikipedia